The 2016 County Championship Shield was the 12th version of the annual English rugby union County Championship, organised by the RFU for the tier 3 English counties.  Each county drew its players from rugby union clubs from the fifth tier and below of the English rugby union league system.  The counties were divided into three pools - one pool with four teams, the others with three teams each, with the winner of each group plus the best runner-up going through to the semi-finals, and the winners of those games meeting in the final held at Twickenham Stadium.  Due to competition changes for the 2017 season (more on this below) a number of teams in the division would be promoted to tier 2 for the following season, joining the 2015 Shield champions Leicestershire who had already been promoted at the start of this season.

After winning their respective pools and semi-final games, Staffordshire and Hampshire met in the final.  In the end it was Hampshire who finished as the champions, defeating Staffordshire, 33–11.

Competition format
The competition format consisted of three groups (one with four teams, two with three teams), based roughly on regional lines where possible.  The four team group consisted of six games, with two teams playing two home games and the others one home game each, while the three team groups saw each team play one home game.  The top side of each group automatically qualified for the semi-finals, as did the best group runner-up. The winners of the semi-finals met in the final at Twickenham Stadium held on 29 May 2016.  Due to changes to the County Championship format for the 2017 competition, four teams from the division would end up being promoted to the tier 2 for the following season, based on performances in the Shield over the past couple of seasons.

Participating counties and ground locations

Group stage

Pool 1

Round 1

Round 2

Round 3

Pool 2

Round 1

Round 2

Round 3

Pool 3

Round 1

Round 2

Round 3

Knock-out Stage

Semi-finals

Final

See also
 English rugby union system
 Rugby union in England

References

External links
 NCA Rugby

2016
2015–16 County Championship